Warren Hazel (born 11 February 1996 in Old Road) is a Saint Kitts and Nevisian athlete who specializes in the 400 metres. He is the 400 metres national record holder. He is studied at Southern Illinois University, United States. He represented Saint Kitts and Nevis at the 2018 Commonwealth Games.

Personal best

Achievements

References

External links
 

1996 births
Living people
Southern Illinois Salukis athletes
Saint Kitts and Nevis male sprinters
World Athletics Championships athletes for Saint Kitts and Nevis
Athletes (track and field) at the 2018 Commonwealth Games
Commonwealth Games competitors for Saint Kitts and Nevis
Competitors at the 2014 Central American and Caribbean Games
Competitors at the 2018 Central American and Caribbean Games